The Province of Natal, commonly called Natal, was a province of South Africa from May 1910 until May 1994. Its capital was Pietermaritzburg. During this period rural areas inhabited by the black African population of Natal were organized into the bantustan of KwaZulu, which was progressively separated from the province, becoming partially autonomous in 1981. Of the white population, the majority were English-speaking people of British descent, causing Natal to become the only province to vote "No" to the creation of a republic in the referendum of 1960, due to very strong monarchist, pro-British Commonwealth, and anti-secessionist sentiment. In the latter part of the 1980s, Natal was in a state of violence between the Inkatha Freedom Party and the African National Congress, with violence subsidising soon after the first non-racial election in 1994.

In 1994, the KwaZulu bantustan was reincorporated into the territory of Natal and the province was redesignated as KwaZulu-Natal.

Districts in 1991

Districts of the province and population at the time of the 1991 census.

 Mount Currie (main town Kokstad): 41,564
 Alfred (main town Harding): 8,794
 Port Shepstone: 67,239
 Umzinto: 46,919
 Ixopo: 22,626
 Polela: 4,364
 Underberg: 9,584
 Impendle: 2,815
 Richmond: 23,476
 Camperdown: 36,315
 Pietermaritzburg: 228,549
 Lions River: 43,060
 New Hanover: 38,207
 Mooirivier: 25,061
 Estcourt: 49,493
 Weenen: 12,485
 Bergville: 22,552
 Umvoti (main town Greytown): 41,160
 Kranskop: 7,565
 Durban: 473,826
 Inanda (main town Verulam): 299,379
 Pinetown: 184,216
 Chatsworth: 179,957
 Kliprivier: 64,782
 Glencoe: 17,265
 Dundee: 31,613
 Dannhauser: 14,154
 Newcastle: 53,584
 Utrecht: 27,798
 Paulpietersburg: 21,072
 Vryheid: 85,518
 Ngotshe: 26,382
 Lower Tugela (main town Stanger): 96,702
 Mtunzini: 18,455
 Eshowe: 13,355
 Mtonjaneni (main town Melmoth): 10,577
 Babanango: 3,069
 Lower Umfolozi (main town Empangeni): 56,082
 Hlabisa: 18,211
 Ubombo (main town Jozini): 2,929

Administrators

See also
 Coat of arms of Natal
 Mtetwa Empire (c. 1750–1817)
 Zululand (1816–1897)
 Natalia Republic (1839–1843)
 Colony of Natal (1843–1910)
 KwaZulu-Natal (1994–)

References

External links 
 
 

1910 establishments in South Africa
1994 disestablishments in South Africa
Former provinces of South Africa
History of South Africa
States and territories established in 1910
States and territories disestablished in 1994